Ferdinand IV, Grand Duke of Tuscany (10 June 1835 – 17 January 1908) was the last Grand Duke of Tuscany from 1859 to 1860.

Biography
Born at Florence, he was the son of Leopold II, Grand Duke of Tuscany, and Princess Maria Antonia of the Two Sicilies.

His first wife died on February 1859. Sometime later, he and his family were forced to flee Florence on 27 April 1859, with the outbreak of a revolution inspired by the outbreak of a war by France and Sardinia-Piedmont against Austria as part of the unification of Italy. The family took refuge in Austria.  After the end of the war, Leopold II abdicated on 21 July and Ferdinand succeeded him as Grand Duke. Ferdinand proved unable to return to Florence to claim his throne, and an elected Tuscan National Assembly formally deposed him only a month later, on 16 August. Ferdinand still hoped to recover his throne, as both France and Austria had promised to recognize his rights to it in the Armistice of Villafranca. However, neither power was willing to take any steps to bring about his restoration; Sardinia would annex Tuscany on 22 March 1860, and with Austria recognizing the new Kingdom of Italy after the Third War of Independence in 1866, Ferdinand's hopes to reclaim the throne were ended.

Subsequently Ferdinand and his family returned to the Imperial House of Austria. While Ferdinand was allowed to keep the grand ducal title as a courtesy and retain his status as grand master of all Tuscan orders of chivalry for his lifetime, his descendants could only bear the title of "Archduke/Archduchess of Austria"; the right to bear the title "Prince/ss of Tuscany" became restricted solely to family members born before 1866. In 1870 Ferdinand relinquished all dynastic rights to the defunct Grand Duchy for himself and his future heirs in favor of his second cousin, Emperor Franz Joseph I, effectively ending the House of Habsburg-Tuscany's status as a sovereign cadet branch.

Ferdinand died in Salzburg in 1908, after spending the rest of his life in exile. Upon his death, his descendants were barred from using their Tuscan titles by Imperial decree.

Family and children 
He married twice and had issue:

From his first marriage in Dresden on 24 November 1856 to Princess Anna of Saxony, (Dresden, 4 January 1836 – Naples, 10 February 1859), daughter of King John I of Saxony, was born:
 Archduchess Maria Antonietta (Florence, 10 January 1858 – Cannes, 13 April 1883). She became Princess-Abbess of the Theresian Convent in the Hradschin in Prague. Unmarried and without Issue.

From his second marriage in Frohsdorf on 11 January 1868 to Princess Alice "Alix" of Bourbon-Parma (Parma, 27 December 1849 – Schwertberg, 16 November 1935), daughter of Duke Charles III of Parma: 
Archduke Leopold Ferdinand (1868–1935). He renounced his titles on 29 December 1902 and took the name Leopold Wölfling. He married three times, without issue.
Archduchess Louise (1870–1947). Married first King Frederick Augustus III of Saxony and after divorcing him married second Enrico Toselli and had issue by both marriages.
Archduke Josef Ferdinand (1872–1942). He married, firstly, Rosa Kaltenbrunner and, after divorcing her married, secondly Gertrud Tomanek, by whom he had issue. Both marriages were morganatic.
Archduke Peter Ferdinand, Prince of Tuscany (1874–1948). Married Princess Maria Cristina of Bourbon-Two Sicilies, and had issue.
Archduke Heinrich Ferdinand (1878–1969). A major general in the Austrian army, morganatically married Maria Karoline Ludescher, and had issue. 
Archduchess Anna Maria (1879–1961). She married Johannes, Prince of Hohenlohe-Bartenstein; their granddaughter married Hans Veit, Count of Toerring-Jettenbach, son of Princess Elizabeth of Greece and Denmark.
Archduchess Margareta Maria (1881–1965)
Archduchess Germana Maria (1884–1955)
Archduke Robert Ferdinand (1885–1895)
Archduchess Agnes Maria (1891–1945)

Honours 
Ferdinand received the following awards:
  Grand Duchy of Tuscany:
 Grand Cross of the Order of Saint Joseph
 Grand Master of the Order of Saint Joseph, 21 July 1859
 Grand Master of the Order of Saint Stephen, 21 July 1859
 Grand Master of the Order of Civil and Military Merit, 21 July 1859
 :
 Knight of the Order of the Golden Fleece, 1852
 Grand Cross of the Royal Hungarian Order of St. Stephen, 1891
  Grand Duchy of Baden:
 Knight of the House Order of Fidelity, 1886
 Knight of the Order of Berthold the First, 1886
 : Knight of the Order of Saint Hubert, 1856
 : Grand Cordon of the Order of Leopold (civil), 24 September 1856
 : Bailiff Knight Grand Cross of Honour and Devotion, 19 December 1856
  Kingdom of Prussia: Knight of the Order of the Black Eagle, 26 January 1861
 : Grand Cross of the Order of the White Falcon, 12 January 1864
 : Knight of the Order of the Rue Crown, 1856
 : Grand Cross of the Order of the Crown, 1882

Ancestry

See also
Risorgimento

Notes

External links 
Genealogy of Ferdinand IV
Grand Ducal House of Tuscany

 

 

Ferdinand IV of Tuscany
Ferdinand IV of Tuscany
House of Habsburg-Lorraine
Austrian princes
Nobility from Florence
Ferdinand 4
Italian exiles
Grand Masters of the Order of Saint Joseph
Knights of the Order of Saint Joseph
Grand Crosses of the Order of Saint Stephen of Hungary
Knights of the Golden Fleece of Austria
Knights of Malta
Burials at the Imperial Crypt